Cattiva (internationally released as The Wicked) is a 1991 Italian drama film directed by Carlo Lizzani. The film is loosely based on real life events of Carl Jung, the founder of analytical psychology, and of Sabina Spielrein. For this film Giuliana De Sio was awarded with a David di Donatello for Best Actress.

Plot 
In the early twentieth century, the young Italian-born Emilia Schmidt leads a comfortable life in Switzerland, with her husband and little son Ludwig, but shows from time to time signs of mental imbalance.

She is admitted to a luxurious clinic in Zürich, where she receives the diagnosis of schizophrenia due to her behavior, thus being defined as "wicked". However, Professor Gustav, a young assistant to the clinic's head physician, Professor Brokner, becomes passionate about her case; using the innovative research of Dr. Sigmund Freud, he is able to partially cure her. This allows Emilia to leave the clinic, not completely cured, but released from her neuroses and confident in Gustav's promise to continue monitoring her health in the future.

Cast 
Giuliana De Sio as Emilia
Julian Sands as Gustav
Erland Josephson as Prof. Brokner
Milena Vukotic as Annette, a patient in the clinic
Didi Perego as Chief nurse
  as Mitzi, Emilia's maid
 Stefano Lescovelli as Leopold Schmidt, Emilia's husband
  as Marta, Emilia's sister 
Massimo Venturiello as Enrico Carossi, Emilia's childhood friend
 Flaminia Lizzani as Anna, Gustav's girlfriend
  as Emilia's mother

References

External links

The Wicked at FilmAffinity

1991 films
Films about psychoanalysis
Films directed by Carlo Lizzani
Films scored by Armando Trovajoli
Italian drama films
Cultural depictions of Carl Jung
1990s Italian-language films